NS International, formerly NS Hispeed, is a rail operator in the Netherlands that operates international intercity and high-speed connections to several European cities. The operator is a subsidiary of the Nederlandse Spoorwegen.

History
NS Hispeed was formed in 2007 when the former international subdivision of NS, NS Internationaal, was rebranded as NS Hispeed. It is a founding member of the Railteam alliance, with a 10% share in the group. In June 2014, they changed their name to NS International. This change was done due to the change in the operations of the high speed line from NS Hispeed to NS Reizigers.

Services
The company operates, together with its partners, direct services to Belgium, France, Germany, Switzerland and the United Kingdom.

Regional cross-border services (from Arnhem, Enschede, Hengelo, Maastricht, Nieuweschans, Venlo, Heerlen and Roosendaal) are not part of NS International, nor was the CityNightLine from Amsterdam to Munich and Zurich.

Rolling stock
NS International is the Dutch partner in three high-speed international services, Eurostar, Thalys and ICE International. Although the rolling stock for these services are pooled, each partner has purchased and owns a number of units in each fleet. NS owns three ICE 3M EMUs used for the ICE services, and two PBKA EMUs operated by Thalys, all of which are quadricurrent.

NS International ordered 16 V250 trains from AnsaldoBreda, with NMBS/SNCB ordering a further 3 sets. They were used on Dutch domestic services and NS International services to Brussels. These sets are eight carriages long and have a top speed of 250 km/h. They entered service in December 2012 - five years later than originally planned. They were taken out of service the following month due to numerous technical issues. Four months later only two of the 9 already delivered trains were still capable of performing test runs.

See also
Dutch railway services
Train routes in the Netherlands

References

External links
NS International

Nederlandse Spoorwegen
Railway companies of the Netherlands
Railteam